The Archdiocese of Lecce is a Latin Church ecclesiastical territory or archdiocese of the Catholic Church in Apulia, southern Italy. The diocese has existed since the 11th century. On 28 September 1960, in the bull Cum a nobis, Pope John XXIII separated the diocese of Lecce from the ecclesiastical province of Otranto and made it directly subject to the Holy See. In the bull Conferentia Episcopalis Apuliae issued on 20 October 1980, Pope John Paul II created the ecclesiastical province of Lecce, with the Archdiocese of Otranto becoming a suffragan diocese.

History

Many years ago, Lecce was known as Lupiæ, Lupia, Lycia, and Aletium. Beginning around the year 1060, Lecce became the seat of a Norman count. One of its notable counts, Tancred of Lecce, contested Emperor Henry VI for the Kingdom of the Two Sicilies. Another count was Gautier de Brienne, a cousin of Tancred.

Chapter and cathedral

The cathedral of Lecce, which was, like nearly all the cathedrals in the Kingdom of Naples, dedicated to the assumption of the body of the Virgin Mary into heaven, was administered and served by a Chapter. The cathedral Chapter was composed of three dignities (the Archdeacon, the Cantor, and the Treasurer) and twenty-four Canons. In 1671, there were twenty Canons. In 1741, there were again twenty-four Canons. In 1885, after the unification of Italy, there were four dignities (the Archdeacon, the Treasurer, the Parocco and the Theologus); there were sixteen other Canons. In 2019, there were ten Canons, and eight honorary Canons.

There was also a collegiate church, the Collegiata di Campi Salentino, which had twenty-seven Canons, headed by an Archpriest and four dignities.<ref>Pietro De Simone, "Lecce," in: V. D'Avino, Cenni storici sulle chiese ... del Regno del Due Sicilie (Napoli: Ranucci 1848),  p. 297 column 1. </ref>

The seminary building was built between 1694 and 1709, by Bishop Michele Pignatelli and Bishop Fabrizio Pignatelli, to designs by Giuseppe Cino. In 1885, the seminary had thirteen teachers and thirty clerics studying for the priesthood; in the previous five years there had been four ordinations and sixty deaths of priests.

Subject to the Holy See
Up until 1960, Lecce had been a suffragan (subordinate) of the archbishopric of Otranto. Reacting to the large increase in population, and to the fact that Lecce had been made a provincial capital by the Italian government, Pope John XXIII issued the bull "Cum a Nobis" on 28 September 1960, separating Lecce from its relationship with the diocese of Otranto and making it directly subject to the Holy See.

Metropolitan archdiocese
Following the Second Vatican Council, and in accordance with the norms laid out in the council's decree, Christus Dominus chapter 40, the Episcopal Conference of Apulia petitioned the Holy See (Pope) that Lecce be made a metropolitan and that a new ecclesiastical province be created. After wide consultations among all affected parties, Pope John Paul II issued a decree on 20 October 1980, elevating Lecce to the status of metropolitan see. He also created the new ecclesiastical province of Lecce, whose constituent bishoprics (suffragans) were to be: Brindisi (no longer a metropolitanate, though the archbishop allowed to retain the title of archbishop), Otranto (no longer a metropolitanate, though the archbishop allowed to retain the title of archbishop), Gallipoli, Nardò, Ostuno, and Uxentina-S. Mariae Leucadensis (Ugento).

Bishops and Archbishops of Lecce
to 1500

...
Teodoro Bonsecolo (attested 1092, 1101)
Formosus (attested 1114, 1115)
Penetranus (attested 1179)
Petrus Guarinus (1179–1182)
Fulco Bellus (1196–1200)
Robertus Volterico (1212–1230)Sede vacante (attested 1239)
Gualterus de Massafra (attested 1254, 1255)
Robertus de Sancto Blasio (c. 1260?)
Petrus de Romana (1267) Bishop-electIgnotus (1268–1269)
Gervasius
Godefredus 
Robertus de Noha (attested 1301)
Joannes de Glandis (1339–1348)
Robertus (Guarini) (1348– ? )
Antonius de Ferraris (1373– ? )
Nicolaus de Tarento (1384– ? ) Avignon ObedienceLudovicus ( ? ) Roman ObedienceLeonardus (1386–1389) Roman ObedienceAntonius de Viterbo, O.Min. (1389–1412)
Tommaso Morganti (1409–1412)
Curello Ciccaro (1412–1429)
Tommaso Ammirato,  OSB (1429–1438)
Guido Giudano, OFM (6 Aug 1438 – 1453)
Antonio Ricci (20 Jul 1453 – 24 Dec 1483 died)
Roberto Caracciolo, OFM (1484–1485)
Marc'Antonio de' Tolomei (1485–1498)
Cardinal Luigi d'Aragona (1498–1502) Apostolic Administrator1500 to 1800

Giacomo Piscicelli (1502–1507)
Pietro Matteo d'Aquino (1508–1511)
Ugolino Martelli (1511–1517)
Giovanni Antonio Acquaviva d'Aragona (1517–1525)
Consalvo di Sangro (19 Jan 1525 – 1530 died)
Alfonso di Sangro (1530–1534 resigned) Bishop-electIppolito de' Medici (20 Apr 1534 – 26 Feb 1535) AdministratorGiovanni Battista Castromediano (26 Feb 1535 – 1552 died)
Braccio Martelli (12 Feb 1552 – 17 Aug 1560 died)
Annibale Saraceni (29 Nov 1560 – 1591 resigned)
Scipione Spina (10 May 1591 – 6 Mar 1639 died)
Luigi Pappacoda (1639–1670)
Antonio Pignatelli del Rastrello (1671 –1682)
Michele Pignatelli, CR (1682–1695)
Fabrizio Pignatelli (1696–1734)
Giuseppe Maria Ruffo (25 May 1735 –1744)
Scipione Sersale (3 Feb 1744 – 11 Jul 1751 died)
Alfonso Sozi Carafa, CRS (15 Nov 1751 – 19 Feb 1783 died)Sede vacante (1783–1792)
Salvatore Spinelli, OSB (26 Mar 1792 –1797)Sede vacante (1797–1818)

1800 to present
Giuseppe Maria Giovene (1807–1818) Vicar ApostolicNicola Caputo de' Marchesi di Cerreto (21 Dec 1818 – 6 Nov 1862 died)Sede vacante (1862–1872)
Valerio Laspro (1872–1877)
Salvatore Luigi Zola, CRL (22 Jun 1877 – 27 Apr 1898 died)
Evangelista (Michael Antonio) di Milia, OFM Cap. (10 Nov 1898 – 17 Sep 1901 died)
Gennaro Trama (14 Feb 1902 – 9 Nov 1927 died)
Alberto Costa (7 Dec 1928 – 2 Aug 1950 died)
Francesco Minerva (17 Dec 1950 – 27 Jan 1981 retired)
Michele Mincuzzi (27 Jan 1981 – 7 Dec 1988 retired)
Cosmo Francesco Ruppi (7 Dec 1988 – 16 Apr 2009 retired)
Domenico Umberto D'Ambrosio (2009–2017)
Michele Seccia (2017 – present)

References

Bibliography
Reference for bishops

Studies

De Leo, Pietro (1973). "Contributo per una nuova Lecce Sacra," in: La Zagaglia: rassegna di scienze, lettere e arti, 57-58 (1973), pp. 3–24 (prima parte, pp. 3–13; seconda parte, pp. 14–24); 65-66 (1975), pp. 3–34

Kamp, Norbert (1975). Kirche und Monarchie im staufischen Königreich Sizilien. I. Prosopographische Grundlegung: 2. Apulien und Kalabrien. München: Wilhelm Fink Verlag. 
Kehr, Paul Fridolin (1962). Italia pontificia. Vol. IX: Samnium — Apulia — Lucania. Berlin: Weidmann. 

Paladini, G. (1932). Studii e memorie storiche sull'antica Lupiae o Sibari del Salente''. Lecce: tip. Modernissima, 1932.

External links
Catholic Encyclopedia article

Roman Catholic dioceses in Apulia
Dioceses established in the 11th century
Religion in Lecce